Melanie Susan "Mel" Appleby (11 July 1966 – 18 January 1990) was one half of the 1980s English duo Mel and Kim. They had a number one hit on the UK Singles Chart in March 1987, with the song "Respectable".

Career
Appleby was born in Hackney, London, to a Jamaican father and a British mother. She initially worked as a glamour model, before joining her sister Kim Appleby to form Mel and Kim. The duo enjoyed considerable chart success in the late 1980s, achieving four UK top ten hits, including the number one "Respectable" (1987), while their debut album, F.L.M. (1987) spent 25 weeks on the UK chart and was certified platinum in the UK.

Death
Appleby died in Westminster, London, of pneumonia following treatment for metastatic paraganglioma on 18 January 1990. She died at the age of 23 and is buried in East Finchley Cemetery.

References

1966 births
1990 deaths
English people of Jamaican descent
English female models
Deaths from cancer in England
People from Hackney Central
20th-century Black British women singers
Burials at East Finchley Cemetery
Mel and Kim members